École des Voyageurs is a French first language elementary school located in Langley, British Columbia, Canada. It serves the French population of the Greater Vancouver Regional District.

Student exchange
In 2007, a number of students from the 6th and 7th grade participated in the national SEVEC student exchange programme.  The twin school for the exchange was École François-Perrot in Île Perrot, Quebec.

Notes

External links
http://voyageurs.csf.bc.ca/
http://www.achievebc.ca/spt/school.aspx?id=9335028&name=voyageur

French-language schools in British Columbia
Elementary schools in British Columbia
Educational institutions in Canada with year of establishment missing